Eshratabad or Ashratabad may refer to:
 Eshratabad Palace in Tehran
 Eshratabad, Isfahan
 Eshratabad, Kerman
 Eshratabad, Qazvin
 Eshratabad, Kashmar, Razavi Khorasan Province
 Eshratabad, Nishapur, Razavi Khorasan Province
 Eshratabad, Miyan Jolgeh, Nishapur County, Razavi Khorasan Province
 Eshratabad, Rashtkhvar, Razavi Khorasan Province
 Eshratabad, Sabzevar, Razavi Khorasan Province